The Dorna is a right tributary of the river Bistrița, in Romania. It discharges into the Bistrița in Vatra Dornei. It flows through the villages Dornișoara, Poiana Stampei, Podu Coșnei, Dorna Candrenilor and the town Vatra Dornei.

Tributaries
The following rivers are tributaries to the river Dorna (from source to mouth):

Left: Tihul, Dornișoara, Teșnița, Teșna, Izvorul Alb, Doceni
Right: Bârsaniul, Prislop, Roșia, Alexeni, Negrișoara, Secu, Colăcelul, Pârâul Roșu

References

External links

rivers of Romania
rivers of Suceava County